Lothar Claesges (3 July 1942 – 12 November 2021) was a German cyclist. He won the gold medal in the Men's team pursuit at the 1964 Summer Olympics. He died on 12 November 2021, at the age of 79.

References

1942 births
2021 deaths
Cyclists at the 1964 Summer Olympics
Olympic cyclists of the United Team of Germany
Olympic gold medalists for the United Team of Germany
German male cyclists
Olympic medalists in cycling
Sportspeople from Krefeld
Cyclists from North Rhine-Westphalia
Medalists at the 1964 Summer Olympics
German track cyclists
20th-century German people